The canton of Stenay is an administrative division of the Meuse department, northeastern France. Its borders were modified at the French canton reorganisation which came into effect in March 2015. Its seat is in Stenay.

It consists of the following communes:
 
Aincreville
Autréville-Saint-Lambert
Baâlon
Beauclair
Beaufort-en-Argonne
Brieulles-sur-Meuse
Brouennes
Cesse
Cléry-le-Grand
Cléry-le-Petit
Doulcon
Dun-sur-Meuse
Fontaines-Saint-Clair
Halles-sous-les-Côtes
Inor
Lamouilly
Laneuville-sur-Meuse
Liny-devant-Dun
Lion-devant-Dun
Luzy-Saint-Martin
Martincourt-sur-Meuse
Milly-sur-Bradon
Mont-devant-Sassey
Montigny-devant-Sassey
Moulins-Saint-Hubert
Mouzay
Murvaux
Nepvant
Olizy-sur-Chiers
Pouilly-sur-Meuse
Sassey-sur-Meuse
Saulmory-Villefranche
Stenay
Villers-devant-Dun
Wiseppe

References

Cantons of Meuse (department)